Marcelo Arévalo and Roberto Maytín were the defending champions but chose to defend their title with different partners. Arévalo partnered Miguel Ángel Reyes-Varela but lost in the first round to Ruben Gonzales and Ruan Roelofse. Maytín partnered Robert Galloway but lost in the first round to Nathan Pasha and Max Schnur.

Gonzales and Roelofse won the title after defeating Pasha and Schnur 2–6, 6–3, [10–8] in the final.

Seeds

Draw

References

External links
 Main draw

Las Vegas Challenger - Doubles
Las Vegas Challenger